Lobelia rhombifolia, commonly known as tufted lobelia, is an annual plant from southern Australia. They range from 5 to 30 cm in height and produce purple flowers, with a white throat and two recurved upper lobes. The flowers appear at different times across their native range:
September to December in Western Australia 
October and November in South Australia 
November in Victoria 
October to February in Tasmania

The species was first formally described in 1845 by German botanist Johann Lehmann in Plantae Preissianae.

In Tasmania, the species is classified as "rare" under the Threatened Species Protection Act.

References

rhombifolia
Flora of South Australia
Flora of Tasmania
Flora of Victoria (Australia)
Flora of Western Australia
Taxa named by Willem Hendrik de Vriese
Plants described in 1845